The 2012 British motorcycle Grand Prix was the sixth round of the 2012 Grand Prix motorcycle racing season. It took place on the weekend of 15–17 June 2012 at Silverstone in Northamptonshire, England.  In qualifying for MotoGP, Álvaro Bautista took the first pole position of his career.

Classification

MotoGP

Moto2

Moto3

Championship standings after the race (MotoGP)
Below are the standings for the top five riders and constructors after round six has concluded.

Riders' Championship standings

Constructors' Championship standings

 Note: Only the top five positions are included for both sets of standings.

References

British motorcycle Grand Prix
British Grand Prix
Motorcycle Grand Prix
British motorcycle Grand Prix